= Constitution (Twenty-fifth Amendment) Act, 2017 =

Amendment to the Constitution of Pakistan

The Constitution (Twenty-fifth Amendment) Act, 2017 was an unsuccessful proposed amendment to the Constitution of Pakistan which called for an increase in pension payments for the widows of judges. The amendment was approved by the standing committee of the National Assembly of Pakistan in February 2017. However, the bill was never adopted and therefore did not become part of Constitution of Pakistan.
